The Industry Act 1975 (c. 68) was an Act of the Parliament of the United Kingdom passed by Harold Wilson's Labour government.

Background

The Labour Party manifesto for the October 1974 general election stated:

A new and urgent Industry Act will provide for a system of Planning Agreements between the Government and key companies to ensure that the plans of those companies are in harmony with national needs and objectives and that Government financial assistance is deployed where it will be most effectively used. Wherever we give direct aid to a company out of public funds we shall reserve the right to take a proportionate share of the ownership of the company; and wherever possible this public support will be channelled through the Planning Agreements System.

These ideas were inspired by the writings of the socialist economist Stuart Holland and gave impetus to the growing desire amongst Labour's left-wing to fulfil the promise contained in Clause IV of the Party's constitution for social ownership of the economy.

Notes

References

Ben Pimlott, Harold Wilson (London: HarperCollins, 1992).

Further reading

Alan Budd, The Politics of Economic Planning (Manchester: Manchester University Press, 1978).
Michael Hatfield, The House the Left Built: Inside Labour Policy Making, 1970-75  (London: Victor Gollancz, 1978).
Mark Wickham-Jones, Economic Strategy and the Labour Party: Politics and Policy-Making, 1970-83 (London: Palgrave Macmillan, 1996).

United Kingdom Acts of Parliament 1975